Dudley Perkins was a BBC Radio broadcaster and writer on legal and consumer matters. He presented the programme Can I Help You? and authored the book of the same title, which dealt, in the context of British law, with issues such as buying a house, serving on a jury, making a will and the legal relationship between husband and wife.

He appeared as a castaway on the BBC Radio programme Desert Island Discs on 18 March 1963.

Bibliography

References 

Year of birth missing
Place of birth missing
Year of death missing
Place of death missing
BBC radio presenters
English legal writers